Estação Brasil is a compilation album by Brazilian solo artist Zé Ramalho, containing songs by him (including one new song, "Nesse Brasil cabôco de Mãe-Preta e Pai João") as well as songs by various Brazilian artists. It was released in 2003.

Track listing

Personnel 
 Zé Ramalho – Acoustic guitar on tracks 1, 4, 5, 6, 7, 8, 9, 10, 11, 12, 13, 15, 16, 17, 20, lead vocals on tracks 1, 5, 6, 7, 8, 9, 10, 11, 12, 13, 14, 15, 16, 17, 19, 20, Arrangement on tracks 2, 8, 13, 14, 17, 18, 19, electric guitar on tracks 2, 18, electric guitar solo on track 4
 Robertinho de Recife – Viola on track 1, twelve-string viola on track 2, arrangement on tracks 2, 4, 5, 6, 7, 9, 15, 16, 19, 20, electric guitar on tracks 4, 8, 9, 16, twelve-string guitar on track 14, bass guitar on track 18, 19, acoustic guitar on track 19, cavaco on track 19, sitar on track 20
 João Lyra – Acoustic guitar on tracks 3, 5, 14, 15 arrangement on track 14
 Rick Ferreira – Electric guitar on track 10, steel guitar on tracks 11, 13
 André Neiva – Bass guitar on tracks 1, 2, 3, 6, 13, 15, 16, 20
 Jamil Joanes – Bass on tracks 8, 14
 Eduardo Krieger – Seven-string bass guitar on track 19
 Luiz Antônio – Arrangement on tracks 1, 12, keyboard on tracks 1, 2, 6, 12, 13, 15, 16, 20
 Dodô de Moraes – Arrangement on track 10, keyboard on track 10
 Jota Moraes – Arrangement on track 14, keyboard on track 14
 Sandro Moreno – Drums on track 10, 11
 João Firmino – Percussion on tracks 3, 6, 7, 15, 16, 20
 Marcos Suzano – Percussion on track 13
 Durval – Zabumba on tracks 2, 8, percussion on track 18
 Zé Gomes – Pandeiro on tracks 2, 8, percussion on track 18
 Naif Simões – Drums on track 2, percussion on tracks 9, 17, 19
 Léo Ortiz – Violin on tracks 1, 6, 15, 20
 Marcio Malard – Cello on track 3
 Lui Coimbra – Cello on track 5
 Andréa Ernest – Flute on track 3
 Cristiano Alves – Clarinet on track 3
 Juarez Araújo – Clarinet on track 19
 Carlos Prazeres – Oboe on track 3
 Carlos Malta – Fife on track 9
 Ismael Oliveira – Horn on track 3
 Toti Cavalcanti – Saxophone on track 10, flute on track 14
 Dominguinhos – Accordion on tracks 2, 7
 Aldrin de Caruaru – Accordion on tracks 4, 17
 Waldonys – Accordion on tracks 8, 19
 Chico Guedes – Choir on tracks 1, 12, 19, bass guitar on tracks 10, 11
 Aldrin de Caruaru – Choir on tracks 1, 12, 19, accordion on tracks 8, 18
 Gilberto Teixeira – Choir on tracks 1, 12, 19
 Boca – Choir on tracks 1, 12, 19
 Roberta de Recife – Choir on tracks 5, 8, bass guitar on track 17
 Jussara Sara – Choir on tracks 5, 8
 Carla Pietro – Choir on tracks 5, 8
 Micheline Linhares – Choir on tracks 5, 8
 Hana – Children choir on track 9
 Carlos Roberto – Children choir on track 9
 Carolina – Children choir on track 9
 Isadora – Children choir on track 9
 Sean – Children choir on track 9
 Ingrid – Children choir on track 9
 Eduardo Souto Neto – Arrangement on track 3

2003 compilation albums
Zé Ramalho albums
Covers albums